Named in the second section of the Book of Enoch, the book of "Parables", Kasbeel is the angel given the responsibility of two oaths. The first oath was Biqa, a secret word that he asked the archangel Michael the pronunciation of. This oath revealed the angels in the Grigori that were to fall, that showed all the secrets of the heavens to man. The second oath was Akae. This oath revealed the secrets of the cycles of the earth.

References

Angels in the Book of Enoch